Paul Frankl (22 April 1878 – 30 January 1962) was an art historian born in Austria-Hungary. 
Frankl is most known for his writings on the history and principles of architecture, which he famously presented within a Gestalt-oriented framework.

Early education and career
Paul Frankl was born in Prague into the prominent rabbinic Spira-Frankl family.  From 1888 to 1896, he attended a German Gymnasium, after which he enrolled in the German Staats-Obergymnasium of Prague, graduating in 1896.  He served for one year as Lieutenant in the Austrian military.  In order to pursue a degree in higher education, he converted to Catholicism, a move that was not uncommon among non-Catholics during this era.  He matriculated to the Technische Hochschule in Munich and, later, Berlin, and graduated with a degree in architecture in 1904.
 
While in Berlin, Frankl fostered social relationships within circles of philosophers and artists whose members included fellow Pragueian Max Wertheimer, who knew Käthe Kollwitz.  These artists and philosophers not only introduced Frankl to new systems of thinking, such as Gestalt psychology, but also to his future wife, the artist and musician, Elsa Herzberg, who shared a studio with Käthe Kollwitz.  Frankl and Herzberg eventually had five children.

In 1908, Frankl left his work as an architect to study philosophy, history, and art history at the Ludwig-Maximilians-Universität in Munich under Heinrich Wölfflin and Berthold Riehl, the founder of the Institut für Kunstgeschichte.  Riehl supervised Frankl's doctoral dissertation on fifteenth-century glass painting in southern Germany.

After the completion of his dissertation in 1910, Frankl worked as Wölfflin's assistant and wrote his Habilitationsschrift, which offered a systematic definition of the formal principles of architecture from the Renaissance onwards.  Frankl was heavily influenced by Wölfflin's understanding of architectural development, but did not adhere to Wölfflin's views on formalism.  From 1914 to 1920, Frankl held a position as privatdozent, which enabled him to teach at the University of Munich while contributing to the Handbuch der Kunstwissenschaft (ed. Albert Brinckmann and Fritz Burger).  In 1914, Frankl wrote his first theoretical work, Die Entwicklungsphasen der neueren Baukunst (1914).  Die Entwicklungsphasen proposes four major categories of art history analysis - spatial composition, treatment of mass and surface, treatment of optical effects, and the relation of design to social function - that Frankl continued to draw upon in his later work.

Frankl held an assistant professorship at the Ludwig Maximilian University of Munich from 1920 to 1921, after which he became full professor at Halle University.  It was here that Frankl initiated his lifelong interest in medieval architecture.  His study, Die frühmittelalterliche und romanische Baukunst (1926) exemplifies his categorical distinctions between Romanesque and Gothic architecture - the former being "additive", "frontal", and "structural" while the latter is "partial", "diagonal", and "textural". In 1933, Frankl's enthusiasm for medieval architecture led him to join a group of medievalists at the 13th International Congress of the History of Art in Stockholm to view  the only gothic church whose original wooden arch scaffolding was still extant.
 
The Nazis terminated Frankl's position in Halle in 1934.  Upon leaving the university, Frankl returned to Munich and wrote his monumental treatise, Das System der Kunstwissenschaft (1938), which offered a comprehensive history of art grounded in phenomenology and morphology.  Das System was issued in Czechoslovakia since Jewish authors were censored in Germany and Austria.  During this time, Frankl also made a brief trip to Constantinople.

Transitions to the United States, 1934-1947
Frankl traveled to the United States in 1938, where he sought work and refuge from Nazi power.  Although he was fluent in seven languages, English was not his strength.  In spite of this, Frankl taught for a short time at a volunteer seminar that Julius S. Held organized.  After six months, Frankl's visa expired and he became desperately ill.  In order to apply for US citizenship, he sailed to Cuba – so as to step on "foreign" soil – and reentered the United States as an immigrant. In 1939, with the assistance of Max Wertheimer, Oscar Kristeller (a professor of Italian Renaissance literature), and Erwin Panofsky, Frankl received a position as art historian at the Institute of Advanced Study at Princeton University. The Institute was under the direction of Frank Aydelotte at that time. In 1949, Frankl received a tenure appointment, which he held until his death.

Four days after Kristallnacht, Frankl's wife, Elsa, and daughter, Susanne, fled to Denmark from Munich.  Because Elsa's son, Wolfgang, was in England, six months after entering Denmark, Elsa  was allowed to enter England as well.  Upon coming to England, she was interned as an "enemy alien" on the Isle of Man.

Wolfgang had left Germany in 1933 to live in Rome, but the increased Fascist threat prompted him to seek safety in England.  When Wolfgang first came to England, he was interned as an "enemy alien". However, since Wolfgang was an architect, he was allowed to live in an apartment with the caveat that if he wandered more than 5 miles from the apartment, he had to inform the authorities.  He helped to design buildings during the rebuilding of London after the Blitz.

Susanne escaped to Sweden with the Danish boat-saving rescue venture (Rescue of the Danish Jews) after the Nazis started their attempt at rounding up the Jews.

Another daughter, Johanna, survived the war in Berlin with protected status with her non-Jewish husband.

Frankl’s youngest daughter, Regula, followed soon after Frankl to the US.  Since she was still a minor, she was allowed to stay in the US without renewing her visa.  She went to Radcliffe under a special program for German refugees.

As a personal response to the plight of the Jewish people and his family, Frankl joined a committee at Princeton that sought to  hypothesize a world government system that would ensure that racial genocide could never happen again.  Among the committee's members numbered Albert Einstein.  During this period, Frankl wrote a book called Welt Regierung (1948), his own thoughts on a system of world government.

Later life and career, 1947-1962
Frankl returned to Europe in 1947 with the support of a Guggenheim Grant.  For two years, Frankl studied European cathedrals and taught at European universities.  After returning to the United States, he wrote The Gothic: Literary Sources and Interpretations through Eight Centuries (1960) and Gothic Architecture (1962), which he completed the day of his death. These works revealed Wölfflin's continued influence on Frankl, who applied his former advisor's ideas of architectural style while supplementing his study with an analysis of social function and religious significance.

Legacy
Frankl's work on spatial analysis influenced many German architectural historians such as Siegfried Giedion and Nikolaus Pevsner.  It is possible that the work of Frankl's pupil, Richard Krautheimer, owes something to Frankl's writings on architectural function and significance. Frankl is responsible for creating the term "akyrism," which connotes the changing contexts and meanings of art.

Materials relating to Frankl's life and work are currently held at the Leo Baeck Institute in NY, USA, and the Exil Literatur Archive in Frankfurt, Germany.

Writings
 Die Glasmalerei des fünfzehnten Jahrhunderts in Bayern und Schwaben (Strasbourg, 1912)
 Die Entwicklungsphasen der neueren Baukunst (Leipzig and Berlin, 1914) (See English translation, The Principles of Architectural History: The Four Phases of Architectural Style, 1420–1900 (Cambridge, MA, and London, 1968, 1973)).
 Die frühmittelalterliche und romanische Baukunst (Potsdam, 1926)
 Das System der Kunstwissenschaft (Brno, 1938)
 Weltregierung (1948)
 Kistenfiger (1956)
 Theobald von Lixheim (1957 Zeit Schrift)
 The Gothic: Literary Sources and Interpretations through Eight Centuries (Princeton, 1960)
 Kunst Chronik (1961 Hemmel)
 "Boucher's Girl on the Couch" (1961)
 Encyclopædia Britannica article on Gothic Architecture (1962)
 "Roundel in Boston" (1962)
 Gothic Architecture, Pelican Hist. A. (Harmondsworth, 1962)
 Zu Fragen des Stils (Leipzig 1988)

References

Further reading
 R. Krautheimer: Obituary, A. J. [New York], xxii/1 (1962), p. 167
 Obituary, Wallraf-Richartz-Jb., xxiv (1962), pp. 7–14
 D. Porphyrios: On the Methodology of Architectural History (London, 1981)
 Gerhard Sonnert and Gerald Holton, "The Grand Wake for Harvard Indifference" in Harvard Magazine September–October 2006

External links
 Profile at Institute for Advanced Study
 

1878 births
1962 deaths
German art historians
German architectural historians
Writers from Prague
Princeton University faculty
Jewish emigrants from Nazi Germany to the United States
Academic staff of the University of Halle
German male non-fiction writers